The Copley Society of art is America's oldest non-profit art association. It was founded in 1879 by the first graduating class of the School of the Museum of Fine Arts and continues to play an important role in promoting its member artists and the visual arts in Boston. The Society is named after the renowned John Singleton Copley.  The gallery currently represents over 400 living artist members, ranging in experience from students to nationally recognized artists and in style from traditional and academic realists to contemporary and abstract painters, photographers, sculptors, and printmakers. Several of the artists working in the tradition of the Boston School of painters exhibit at the Copley Society of Art, along with the Guild Of Boston Artists a few doors down from the Copley Society of Art's Newbury Street location.

The gallery hosts between 15 and 20 exhibitions each year, including solo exhibitions, thematic group shows, juried competitions, and fundraising events.

The most well known of these events is the annual "Fresh Paint" auction. Several artist members are chosen by the gallery to spend one day together painting outside in the city. The paintings are brought back to the gallery while still wet, placed directly into frames and mounted on the walls for sale through silent auction. The final night of the week-long event, A few selected pieces are included in a live auction. Although usual commission split for the gallery is 60 percent to the artist and 40 percent to the Copley Society, for this event the artists are required to donate 50 percent of the sale, and encouraged to donate up to 100 percent of the selling price to the non-profit organization.

The Copley Society has helped establish the careers of many of Boston's prominent full-time professional fine artists.

Notable artists 

 Rick Fleury
 Candace Whittemore Lovely
 Dianne Panarelli-Miller
 Sergio Roffo
 Janis Saunders
 Charles Tersolo
 Sam Vokey
 Wheeler Williams
 John Wilson (sculptor) - Instructor
 Mikel Wintermantel

See also
 Grundmann Studios, home of the society 1893-1917

References

External link

Culture of Boston
Clubs and societies in Boston
Arts organizations based in Massachusetts
Arts organizations established in the 1870s
1879 establishments in Massachusetts